Electric is a Norwegian songwriting and production duo, composed of Henrik Barman Michelsen and Edvard Førre Erfjord. Perhaps best known for their work with Little Mix on their #1 UK hits Black Magic and Shout Out to My Ex, the latter of which won Single of the Year at the 2017 Brit Awards, as well as UK #1 I'll Be There by Jess Glynne, they have worked with artists such as Olly Murs, Machine Gun Kelly, Hailee Steinfeld, The Wanted, Cheryl Cole, LÉON, and Fifth Harmony.

Background
Michelsen and Erfjord met at the Liverpool Institute for Performing Arts, a school cofounded by Sir Paul McCartney. Michelsen was the first person at LIPA to receive the Music Producers Guild (UK) Prize, "a prize aimed at rewarding the most promising student to graduate from LIPA's Sound Technology degree course."

Discography

Singles

Full discography

References

Norwegian songwriters
Norwegian record producers